Pleurotomaria is an extinct genus of sea snails, marine gastropod molluscs in the family Pleurotomariidae.

Species
With current taxonomic changes the genus Pleurotomaria has been reserved exclusively for fossil species (denoted with † below).
Known fossil species of Pleurotomaria include:

 † Pleurotomaria agarista Billings, 1865
 † Pleurotomaria anglica  (Sowerby, 1818) (synonym: Trochus anglicus)
 † Pleurotomaria angulosa d'Orbigny, 1842
 † Pleurotomaria antitorquata  Münster, 1840
 † Pleurotomaria arctica Toula, 1875
 † Pleurotomaria arenaria Girty, 1908
 † Pleurotomaria awakinoensis Begg and Grant-Mackie, 2003
 † Pleurotomaria barrealensis (Cowper Reed, 1927) (synonym: Neoplatyteichum barrealensis)
 † Pleurotomaria bicoronata  Sandberger and Sandberger, 1855
 † Pleurotomaria biondii Gemmellaro, 1889
 † Pleurotomaria bodana Roemer, 1855
 † Pleurotomaria brennensis Reed, 1932
 † Pleurotomaria calcifera Billings, 1859
 † Pleurotomaria cancellata Stauffer, 1909
 † Pleurotomaria carinifera Girty, 1908
 † Pleurotomaria catherinae Gemmellaro, 1889
 † Pleurotomaria cingulata Goldfuss, 1844
 † Pleurotomaria coheni Gemmellaro, 1889
 † Pleurotomaria comata Lindström, 1884
 † Pleurotomaria coniformis de Koninck, 1883
 † Pleurotomaria costulatocanaliculata Sandberger and Sandberger, 1853
 † Pleurotomaria discoidea Girty, 1908
 † Pleurotomaria doris Hall, 1862
 † Pleurotomaria elderi Girty, 1908 
 † Pleurotomaria estella Hall and Whitfield, 1872
 † Pleurotomaria exaltata d’Archiac and de Verneuil, 1842
 † Pleurotomaria gracilis Phillips, 1841
 † Pleurotomaria halliana Shumard, 1859
 † Pleurotomaria hectori (Trechmann, 1918)  (synonym: Pleurotomaria (Sisenna) hectori)
 † Pleurotomaria helicoides  Cowper Reed, 1901
 † Pleurotomaria hisingeri Goldfuss, 1864
 † Pleurotomaria hokonuiensis Trechmann, 1918 
 † Pleurotomaria? homoruspira Szabó, 2017
 † Pleurotomaria hyale Billings, 1865
 † Pleurotomaria indistincta Szabó, 2017
 † Pleurotomaria isaacsii Hall and Whitfield, 1873
 † Pleurotomaria isomorpha Gemmellaro, 1889
 † Pleurotomaria karetai  Begg and Grant-Mackie, 2003
 † Pleurotomaria kiritehereensis  Begg and Grant-Mackie, 2003
 † Pleurotomaria? laponya  Szabó, 2017
 † Pleurotomaria mariani Gemmellaro, 1889
 † Pleurotomaria mazarensis Gemmellaro, 1889
 † Pleurotomaria mica Girty, 1908
 † Pleurotomaria monilifera Terquem and Jourdy, 1873
 † Pleurotomaria murchisoniaeformis Gemmellaro, 1889
 † Pleurotomaria neglecta  Girty, 1908
 † Pleurotomaria neosolodurina  Dacque, 1905
 † Pleurotomaria nikitini Fliegel, 1901
 † Pleurotomaria nodulocincta  Szabó, 2017
 † Pleurotomaria nodulocostulata  Szabó, 2017
 † Pleurotomaria nongradata  Szabó, 2017
 † Pleurotomaria notlingi Koken, 1896
 † Pleurotomaria nuda Delpey, 1941
 † Pleurotomaria obliqua Fliegel, 1901 
 † Pleurotomaria okensis Gerasimov, 1992 
 † Pleurotomaria otapiriensis Begg and Grant-Mackie, 2003
 † Pleurotomaria perfasciata Hall, 1860
 † Pleurotomaria pericarinata  (Hall, 1847) (synonyms: Cyclonema pericarinata, Gyronema pericarinatum)
 † Pleurotomaria perornata Shumard, 1859
 † Pleurotomaria perversa Whidborne, 1889
 † Pleurotomaria planulata Girty, 1908
 † Pleurotomaria plicifera d'Eichwald, 1860
 † Pleurotomaria postumia  Billings, 1865
 † Pleurotomaria proutiana Shumard, 1859
 † Pleurotomaria psiche Gemmellaro, 1889
 † Pleurotomaria putilla Girty, 1908
 † Pleurotomaria replicata Lindström, 1884
 † Pleurotomaria retroplicata Gemmellaro, 1889
 † Pleurotomaria richardsoni Girty, 1908
 † Pleurotomaria roemeri (Koken, 1889) (synonym: Euryzone roemeri)
 † Pleurotomaria rouillieri d'Orbigny, 1850 
 † Pleurotomaria salomonensis Gemmellaro, 1889
 † Pleurotomaria seminodosa  Szabó, 2017
 † Pleurotomaria sigaretus  Sandberger and Sandberger, 1855
 † Pleurotomaria spilsbyensis Cox, 1960 
 † Pleurotomaria striatissima Cowper Reed, 1901
 † Pleurotomaria subsulcata Goldfuss, 1844
 † Pleurotomaria subtilistriata Hall, 1847
 † Pleurotomaria trinchesii Gemmellaro, 1889
 † Pleurotomaria tunstallensis King, 1848
 † Pleurotomaria viola  Billings, 1865
 † Pleurotomaria virgo  Billings, 1865
 † Pleurotomaria waimumu Begg and Grant-Mackie, 2003
 † Pleurotomaria wiesberghausensis  Szabó, 2017
 † Pleurotomaria wurmi Römer, 1843
 † Pleurotomaria zitteli Holzapfel, 1882

Species brought into synonymy 
  Pleurotomaria adansoniana Crosse & Fischer, 1861: synonym of  Entemnotrochus adansonianus (Crosse & Fischer, 1861)
  Pleurotomaria africana Tomlin, 1948: synonym of Bayerotrochus africanus (Tomlin, 1948)
  Pleurotomaria beyrichii Hilgendorf, 1877: synonym of Mikadotrochus beyrichii (Hilgendorf, 1877)
  Pleurotomaria hirasei Pilsbry, 1903: synonym of Mikadotrochus hirasei (Pilsbry, 1903)
 
 † Pleurotomaria humboldtii Buch, 1839: synonym of † Lithotrochus humboldtii (Buch, 1839) 
 † Pleurotomaria penultima d'Orbigny, 1850: synonym of † Leptomaria penultima (d'Orbigny, 1850) (original combination)
 † Pleurotomaria peresii d'Orbigny, 1850: synonym of † Leptomaria peresii (d'Orbigny, 1850) (original combination)
  Pleurotomaria quoyana Fischer & Bernardi, 1856: synonym of Perotrochus quoyanus quoyanus (Fischer & Bernardi, 1856)
  Pleurotomaria rumphii Schepman, 1879: synonym of Entemnotrochus rumphii (Schepman, 1879)
  Pleurotomaria salmiana Rolle, 1899: synonym of Mikadotrochus salmianus (Rolle, 1899)
  † Pleurotomaria scalaris Münster, 1841: synonym of  † Schizogonium scalare (Münster, 1841) (original combination)
  † Pleurotomaria scitula Meek & Worthen, 1861: synonym of  † Dictyotomaria scitula (Meek & Worthen, 1861)
  † Pleurotomaria spilsbiensis Cox, 1960: synonym of   †Pleurotomaria spilsbyensis Cox, 1960 (incorrect subsequent spelling of the species epithet)
 † Pleurotomaria spironema Meek & Worthen, 1866 : synonym of † Globodoma spironema (Meek & Worthen, 1866): synonym of † Nemaspira spironema (Meek & Worthen, 1866)  (basionym)
 †Pleurotomaria subglobosa Hall in Miller, 1877: synonym of † Nemaspira subglobosa (Hall in Miller, 1877) (basionym)
 † Pleurotomaria subornata Münster, 1844: synonym of † Bathrotomaria subornata (Münster, 1844): synonym of † Szabotomaria subornata (Münster, 1844)
 †Pleurotomaria subpenea Netschaev, 1894: synonym of † Baylea subpenea (Netschaev, 1894) (basionym)
 † Pleurotomaria syssollae Keyserling, 1846: synonym of † Bathrotomaria syssollae (Keyserling, 1846) (basionym)
  †Pleurotomaria thouetensis (Hébert & Deslongschamps, 1860): synonym of † Amphitrochus thouetensis (Hébert & Deslongschamps, 1860) (superseded combination)
 † Pleurotomaria trochus Trautschold, 1860: synonym of † Proconulus rouillieri (d'Orbigny, 1850) (a junior synonym)
 † Pleurotomaria undulata Roemer, 1843: synonym of † Humboldtiella undulata (Roemer, 1843) (original combination)
 † Pleurotomaria uniangulata Hall, 1845: synonym of † Viviparus uniangulatus (Hall, 1845) (new combination)
  Pleurotomaria westralis Whitehead, 1987: synonym of Bayerotrochus westralis (Whitehead, 1987)
 † "Pleurotomaria" perlata Hall, 1852: synonym of Isfarispira perlata (Hall, 1852)
 Pleurotomaria westralis Whitehead, 1987: synonym of Bayerotrochus westralis (Whitehead, 1987) (original combination)
  † Pleurotomaria woodsi Wilckens, 1922: synonym of  † Chelotia woodsi (Wilckens, 1922)

References

 Schmidt, W. & O. Bellec (1994). Findings of some uncommon sea-shells off Madagascar. African Journal of Tropical Hydrobiology and Fisheries 5(1): 63 - 66
 J. G. Begg and J. A. Grant-Mackie. 2003. New Zealand and New Caledonian Triassic Pleurotomariidae (Gastropoda, Mollusca). Journal of the Royal Society of New Zealand 33:223-268

External links
 Defrance J.L.M. (1826). Pleurotomaire (foss.). pp. 381-383, in: Dictionnaire des Sciences Naturelles (F. Cuvier, ed.), vol. 41. Levrault, Strasbourg & Le Normant, Paris
  Dall, W. H. (1902). Note on the names Elachista and Pleurotomaria. The Nautilus. 15(11): 127

Jurassic gastropods
Cretaceous gastropods
Pleurotomariidae
Jurassic first appearances
Cretaceous extinctions
Jeffersonville Limestone
Paleozoic life of Ontario
Prehistoric gastropods of North America